The Special Jury Prize is an award given at the Locarno International Film Festival. It is awarded to the second best film in the international competition section.

Award Winners

References

External links
 

Swiss film awards
Lists of films by award
Locarno Festival